Makeshift Patriot is an EP by Sage Francis.  The title track was originally released as a free MP3 on the day it was written and recorded, October 11, 2001.  The track is a  comment on the American media and its response to the September 11, 2001 attacks.  The lyrics are written from first hand experience, worked into the track are recordings from Francis' visit to Ground Zero five days after the attack. The song can also be found on the Known UnSoldier "Sick Of Waging War..." CD.

Track listing

Influences
The track "Makeshift Patriot" samples "He Likes It" a song by The McCoys from their 1968 album The Infinite McCoys.

See also
 List of anti-war songs

References

Sage Francis albums
2003 EPs
Anticon EPs